Angelo Zanelli (1879–1942) was an Italian sculptor.

He was born at San Felice del Benaco, near Brescia. In 1904 he moved to Rome, where he met Felice Carena. He won the contract for the realization of sculptures in the large Monument to Vittorio Emanuele II in the same city, to which he worked until 1925. They include the tomb of the Unknown Soldier and the statue of Goddess Rome.

He usually worked for public commissions, also abroad.

Selected works
Sculptures of the Monument to Vittorio Emanuele II (1925), Rome
Monument to the Victims of World War I, Imola (1928)
"Statue of the Republic" (1929), El Capitolio, Havana, Cuba.
"El Trabajo" (1929), El Capitolio, Havana, Cuba.
"La Virtud Tutelar" (1929), El Capitolio, Havana, Cuba.

References
Valotti/Terraroli; Antonio Zanelli (1879–1942) Contributo per un calalogo; Comunità Montana di Valle Sabbia (2007).

1879 births
1942 deaths
Artists from the Province of Brescia
20th-century Italian sculptors
20th-century Italian male artists
Italian male sculptors